In enzymology, a formylaspartate deformylase is an enzyme that catalyzes the chemical reaction

N-formyl-L-aspartate + H2O  formate + L-aspartate

Thus, the two substrates of this enzyme are N-formyl-L-aspartate and H2O, whereas its two products are formate and L-aspartate.

This enzyme belongs to the family of hydrolases, those acting on carbon-nitrogen bonds other than peptide bonds, specifically in linear amides.  The systematic name of this enzyme class is N-formyl-L-aspartate amidohydrolase. This enzyme is also called formylaspartic formylase (formylase I, formylase II).  This enzyme participates in histidine metabolism and glyoxylate and dicarboxylate metabolism.

References

 

EC 3.5.1
Enzymes of unknown structure